Zurbriggen is a surname. Notable people with the surname include:

Bernadette Zurbriggen (born 1956), Swiss alpine skier
Edwin Zurbriggen, Swiss para-alpine skier
Hans Zurbriggen (1920–1950), Swiss ski jumper
Heidi Zurbriggen (born 1967), Swiss alpine skier
Matthias Zurbriggen (1856–1917), 19th-century alpinist and mountain guide
Peter Stephan Zurbriggen (1943-2022), Swiss archbishop of the Catholic Church
Pirmin Zurbriggen (born 1963), Swiss alpine skier
Robert Zurbriggen (1917–1952), Swiss cross-country skier and biathlete
Silvan Zurbriggen (born 1981), Swiss alpine skier

See also
145562 Zurbriggen, a main-belt asteroid